Brecon by-election or similar terms may refer to:

 1854 Brecon by-election 
 1858 Breconshire by-election 
 1875 Breconshire by-election 
 February 1866 Brecon by-election
 October 1866 Brecon by-election 
 1869 Brecon by-election 
 1870 Brecon by-election 
 1939 Brecon and Radnorshire by-election
 1985 Brecon and Radnor by-election 
 2019 Brecon and Radnorshire by-election